This is a discography of American rapper and producer Erick Sermon as a solo artist.

Studio albums

Compilation

Mixtapes
 2012: Breath of Fresh Air
 2017: Green Eyed Remixes
 2018: Green Eyed Remixes 2

Solo singles

References

Discographies of American artists
Hip hop discographies
Production discographies